Larling is a village and former civil parish, now in the parish of Roudham and Larling, in the Breckland district, in the county of Norfolk, England. The village is 8.5 miles east north east of Thetford, 21.4 miles west south west of Norwich and 94 miles north east  of London. In 1931 the parish had a population of 159.

History
The villages name means 'Lyrel's people'. Earlier spellings include Lurling, Lirling, Lerling, or Lerlingford.

Larling has an entry in the Domesday Book of 1085. In the great book Larling is recorded by the name ‘’Lur(i)inga’’. The main landholder is William de Warenne with the main tenant being Hugh. The survey also mentions a mill.

On 1 April 1935 the parish was abolished and merged with Roudham.

The Parish Church of Saint Ethelbert
The still-standing medieval church was built in the 12th century, and was expanded in the 1340s creating the chancel, with a tower later being added in the 16th century. The church is built of flint, with stone used only for dressings. The tower is in the 15th-century Perpendicular style. On the north side there is a staircase turret that leads to the belfry. The windows date from the 15th century also. There is an ornamented Norman doorway, with one of the pillars carrying a mass dial. Inside the church is a four-sided font from the 12th century. The walls used to be covered in decorative paintings, one of them including a large painting of St Christopher.  An organisation under the name 'Friends of Thurton Church' continue to help raise money for future restorations and the ongoing maintenance of the church.

Transport
The nearest railway station with a full service is at Thetford for the Breckland Line which runs between Cambridge and Norwich, but Harling Road station offers two trains a day in each direction. The nearest airport is Norwich International Airport. The village is situated a little north of the A11 Trunk road.

Shrubb Family
Shrubb family is one of the longest running communal communities in England. Founded in 1970 in a 17th-century cottage near the old A11 and the Angel pub, the membership and fortunes of the community have fluctuated over the years, but the ethos of low impact living and environmental harmony have persisted.
Shrubb is listed on the Diggers and Dreamers online directory and there is a video of the early days at Shrubb on YouTube titled 'Shrubb Family 1973 part 1 & 2'. Shrubb is featured in "Communes in Britain" by Andrew Rigby, 1974. As of recent years the membership of the group has fluctuated and has been left with around 6 members.

References

External links 

Larling Church Website
Shrubb Family

Villages in Norfolk
Former civil parishes in Norfolk
Breckland District